In the arts and in literature, the term avant-garde (advance guard and vanguard) identifies a genre of art, an experimental work of art, and the experimental artist who created the work of art, which usually is aesthetically innovative, whilst initially being ideologically unacceptable to the artistic establishment of the time. The military metaphor of an advance guard identifies the artists and writers whose innovations in style, form, and subject-matter challenge the artistic and aesthetic validity of the established forms of art and the literary traditions of their time; thus how the artists who created the anti-novel and Surrealism were ahead of their times.

As a stratum of the intelligentsia of a society, avant-garde artists promote progressive and radical politics and advocate for societal reform with and through works of art. In the essay "The Artist, the Scientist, and the Industrialist" (1825) Benjamin Olinde Rodrigues's political usage of vanguard identified the moral obligation of artists to "serve as [the] avant-garde" of the people, because "the power of the arts is, indeed, the most immediate and fastest way" to realise social, political, and economic reforms.

In the realm of culture, the artistic experiments of the avant-garde push the aesthetic boundaries of societal norms, such as the disruptions of modernism in poetry, fiction, and drama, painting, music, and architecture, the occurred in the late 19th and in the early 20th centuries. In art history the socio-cultural functions of avant-garde art trace from Dada (1915–1920s) through the Situationist International (1957–1972) to the Postmodernism of the American Language poets (1960s–1970s).

History 
The French military term avant-garde (advanced guard) identified a reconnaissance unit who scouted the terrain ahead of the main force of the army. In 19th-century French politics, the term avant-garde (vanguard) identified Left-wing political reformists who agitated for radical political change in French society. In the mid-19th century, as a cultural term, avant-garde identified a genre of art that advocated art-as-politics, art as an aesthetic and political means for realising social change in a society. Since the 20th century, the art term avant-garde identifies a stratum of the Intelligentsia that comprises novelists and writers, artists and architects et al. whose creative perspectives, ideas, and experimental artworks challenge the cultural values of contemporary bourgeois society. In the U.S. of the 1960s, the post–WWII changes to American culture and society allowed avant-garde artists to produce works of art that addressed the matters of the day, usually in political and sociologic opposition to the cultural conformity inherent to popular culture and to consumerism as a way of life and as a worldview.

Theories
In The Theory of the Avant-Garde (Teoria dell'arte d'avanguardia, 1962), the academic Renato Poggioli provides an early analysis of the avant-garde as art and as artistic movement. Surveying the historical and social, psychological and philosophical aspects of artistic vanguardism, Poggioli's examples of avant-garde art, poetry, and music, show that avant-garde artists share some values and ideals as contemporary bohemians.

In Theory of the Avant-Garde (Theorie der Avantgarde, 1974), the literary critic Peter Bürger looks at The Establishment's embrace of socially critical works of art as capitalist co-optation of the artists and the genre of avant-garde art, because "art as an institution neutralizes the political content of the individual work [of art]".
 
In Neo-avantgarde and Culture Industry: Essays on European and American Art from 1955 to 1975 (2000), Benjamin H. D. Buchloh argues for a dialectical approach to such political stances by avant-garde artists and the avant-garde genre of art.

Society and the avant-garde

Sociologically, as a stratum of the intelligentsia of a society, avant-garde artists, writers, architects, et al. produce artefacts — works of art, books, buildings — that intellectually and ideologically oppose the conformist value system of mainstream society. In the essay "Avant-Garde and Kitsch" (1939), Clement Greenberg said that the artistic vanguard oppose high culture and reject the artifice of mass culture, because the avant-garde functionally oppose the dumbing down of society — be it with low culture or with high culture. That in a capitalist society each medium of mass communication is a factory producing artworks, and is not a legitimate artistic medium; therefore, the products of mass culture are kitsch, simulations and simulacra of Art.

Walter Benjamin in the essay "The Work of Art in the Age of Mechanical Reproduction" (1939) and Theodor Adorno and Max Horkheimer in the Dialectic of Enlightenment (1947) said that the artifice of mass culture voids the artistic value (the aura) of a work of art. That the capitalist culture industry (publishing and music, radio and cinema, etc.) continually produces artificial culture for mass consumption, which is facilitated by mechanically produced art-products of mediocre quality displacing art of quality workmanship; thus, the profitability of art-as-commodity determines its artistic value.

In The Society of the Spectacle (1967), Guy Debord said that the financial, commercial, and economic co-optation of the avant-garde into a commodity produced by neoliberal capitalism makes doubtful that avant-garde artists will remain culturally and intellectually relevant to their societies for preferring profit to cultural change and political progress. In The Theory-Death of the Avant-Garde (1991), Paul Mann said that the avant-garde are economically integral to the contemporary institutions of the Establishment, specifically as part of the culture industry. Noting the conceptual shift, theoreticians, such as Matei Calinescu, in Five Faces of Modernity: Modernism, Avant-garde, Decadence, Kitsch, Postmodernism (1987), and Hans Bertens in The Idea of the Postmodern: A History (1995), said that Western culture entered a post-modern time when the modernist ways of thought and action and the production of art have become redundant in a capitalist economy.

Parting from the claims of Greenberg in the late 1930s and the insights of Poggioli in the early 1960s, in The De-Definition of Art: Action Art to Pop to Earthworks (1983), the critic Harold Rosenberg said that since the middle of the 1960s the politically progressive avant-garde ceased being adversaries to artistic commercialism and the mediocrity of mass culture, which political disconnection transformed being an artist into "a profession, one of whose aspects is the pretense of overthrowing [the profession of being an artist]."

Moreover, the artistically progressive term avant-garde (advance guard) is compared and contrasted to the artistically reactionary term arrière-garde (rear guard) of artists who oppose the avant-garde as art and as culture  The art historians Natalie Adamson and Toby Norris said that the arrière-garde is not reducible to a style of kitsch art or to political reaction, but identifies the cohort of self-conscious artists whose art opposes the legacy of the avant-garde, whilst self-aware that their artistic cohort is anachronistic in the world of the arts; nonetheless, the critic Charles Altieri explains their existence as the interdependence of the genres as art, "where there is an avant-garde, there must be an arrière-garde."

Examples

Music

Avant-garde in music can refer to any form of music working within traditional structures while seeking to breach boundaries in some manner. The term is used loosely to describe the work of any musicians who radically depart from tradition altogether. By this definition, some avant-garde composers of the 20th century include Arnold Schoenberg, Richard Strauss (in his earliest work), Charles Ives, Igor Stravinsky, Anton Webern,  Edgard Varèse, Alban Berg, George Antheil (in his earliest works only), Henry Cowell (in his earliest works), Harry Partch, John Cage, Iannis Xenakis, Morton Feldman, Karlheinz Stockhausen, Pauline Oliveros,  Philip Glass, Meredith Monk, Laurie Anderson, and Diamanda Galás.

There is another definition of "Avant-gardism" that distinguishes it from "modernism": Peter Bürger, for example, says avant-gardism rejects the "institution of art" and challenges social and artistic values, and so necessarily involves political, social, and cultural factors. According to the composer and musicologist Larry Sitsky, modernist composers from the early 20th century who do not qualify as avant-gardists include Arnold Schoenberg, Anton Webern, and Igor Stravinsky; later modernist composers who do not fall into the category of avant-gardists include Elliott Carter, Milton Babbitt, György Ligeti, Witold Lutosławski, and Luciano Berio, since "their modernism was not conceived for the purpose of goading an audience."

The 1960s saw a wave of free and avant-garde music in jazz genre, embodied by artists such as Ornette Coleman, Sun Ra, Albert Ayler, Archie Shepp, John Coltrane and Miles Davis. In the rock music of the 1970s, the "art" descriptor was generally understood to mean "aggressively avant-garde" or "pretentiously progressive". Post-punk artists from the late 1970s rejected traditional rock sensibilities in favor of an avant-garde aesthetic.

Theatre

Whereas the avant-garde has a significant history in 20th-century music, it is more pronounced in theatre and performance art, and often in conjunction with music and sound design innovations, as well as developments in visual media design. There are movements in theatre history that are characterized by their contributions to the avant-garde traditions in both the United States and Europe. Among these are Fluxus, Happenings, and Neo-Dada.

Art movements

Abstract expressionism
Artivism
COBRA
Conceptual art
Constructivism
Cubism
Dadaism
De Stijl
Expressionism
Fauvism
Fluxus
Futurism
Happening
Imaginism
Imagism
Impressionism
Incoherents
Land art
Les Nabis
Lyrical Abstraction
Minimal art
Neo-Dada
Orphism
Pop art
Precisionism
Primitivism
Rayonism
Situationism
Suprematism
Surrealism
Symbolism
Tachisme
Universal Constructivism
Viennese Actionism
Vorticism
Creationism
Nadaism
Stridentism
Ultraist

See also

Anti-art
Bauhaus
Experimental film
Experimental literature
Experimental music
Experimental theatre
L'enfant terrible
List of avant-garde artists
Outsider art
Relationship between avant-garde art and American pop culture
Russian avant-garde

References

Further reading
 Robert Archambeau. "The Avant-Garde in Babel. Two or Three Notes on Four or Five Words", Action-Yes vol. 1, issue 8, Autumn 2008.
 Bäckström, Per (ed.), Centre-Periphery. The Avant-Garde and the Other, Nordlit. University of Tromsø, no. 21, 2007.
 Bäckström, Per. "One Earth, Four or Five Words. The Peripheral Concept of 'Avant-Garde, Action-Yes vol. 1, issue 12, Winter 2010.
 Bäckström, Per & Bodil Børset (eds.), Norsk avantgarde (Norwegian Avant-Garde), Oslo: Novus, 2011.
 Bäckström, Per & Benedikt Hjartarson (eds.), Decentring the Avant-Garde, Amsterdam & New York: Rodopi, Avantgarde Critical Studies, 2014.
 Bäckström, Per and Benedikt Hjartarson. "Rethinking the Topography of the International Avant-Garde", in Decentring the Avant-Garde, Per Bäckström & Benedikt Hjartarson (eds.), Amsterdam & New York: Rodopi, Avantgarde Critical Studies, 2014.
 Barron, Stephanie, and  Maurice Tuchman. 1980. The Avant-garde in Russia, 1910–1930: New Perspectives: Los Angeles County Museum of Art [and] Hirshhorn Museum and Sculpture Garden, Smithsonian Institution, Washington, D. C. Los Angeles: Los Angeles County Museum of Art  (pbk.); Cambridge, MA: Distributed by the MIT Press  (pbk.)
 Bazin, Germain. 1969. The Avant-garde in Painting. New York: Simon and Schuster. 
 Berg, Hubert van den, and Walter Fähnders (eds.). 2009. Metzler Lexikon Avantgarde. Stuttgart: Metzler.  
 Crane, Diana. 1987. The Transformation of the Avant-garde: The New York Art World, 1940–1985. Chicago: University of Chicago Press. 
 Daly, Selina, and Monica Insinga (eds.). 2013. The European Avant-garde: Text and Image. Newcastle upon Tyne: Cambridge Scholars. .
 Fernández-Medina, Nicolás, and Maria Truglio (eds.). Modernism and the Avant-garde Body in Spain and Italy. Routledge, 2016.
 Harding, James M., and John Rouse, eds. Not the Other Avant-Garde: The Transnational Foundations of Avant-Garde Performance.  University of Michigan, 2006.
 Hjartarson, Benedikt. 2013. Visionen des Neuen. Eine diskurshistorische Analyse des frühen avantgardistischen Manifests. Heidelberg: Winter.
 Kostelanetz, Richard, and H. R. Brittain. 2000. A Dictionary of the Avant-Gardes, second edition. New York: Schirmer Books. . Paperback edition 2001, New York: Routledge.  (pbk.)
 Kramer, Hilton. 1973. The Age of the Avant-garde; An Art Chronicle of 1956−1972. New York: Farrar, Straus and Giroux. 
 Léger, Marc James (ed.). 2014. The Idea of the Avant Garde—And What It Means Today. Manchester and New York: Manchester University Press; Oakland: Left Curve. .
 Maerhofer, John W. 2009. Rethinking the Vanguard: Aesthetic and Political Positions in the Modernist Debate, 1917–1962. Newcastle upon Tyne: Cambridge Scholars Press. 
 Mann, Paul.  The Theory-Death of the Avant-Garde.  Indiana University Press, 1991.  
 Novero, Cecilia.  2010. Antidiets of the Avant-Garde: From Futurist Cooking to Eat Art. (University of Minnesota Press) 
 Pronko, Leonard Cabell. 1962. Avant-garde: The Experimental Theater in France. Berkeley: University of California Press.
 Roberts, John. 2015. Revolutionary Time and the Avant-Garde. London and New York: Verso.  (cloth);  (pbk).
 Schechner, Richard.  "The Five Avant-Gardes or ... [and] ... or None?" The Twentieth-Century Performance Reader, 2nd ed., ed. Michael Huxley and Noel Witts (New York and London: Routledge, 2002).
 Schmidt-Burkhardt, Astrit. 2005. Stammbäume der Kunst: Zur Genealogie der Avantgarde. Berlin Akademie Verlag.  [online version is available]
 Sell, Mike.  The Avant-Garde: Race, Religion, War.  Seagull Books, 2011.
 Shishanov, V. A. 2007. Vitebskii muzei sovremennogo iskusstva: istoriia sozdaniia i kollektsii (1918–1941). Minsk: Medisont.  Online edition

External links
Historic Avant-Garde Periodicals for Digital Research, The Blue Mountain Project, Princeton University Library
Avant-garde and Modernist Magazines (Monoskop)
Magazines in Bibliothèque Kandinsky, Centre Pompidou, Paris
Periodicals in Iowa Digital Library, University of Iowa Libraries
Digital Dada Library of International Dada Archive, University of Iowa Libraries
Magazines in Digital Collections of Beinecke Rare Book & Manuscript Library
Avant-Garde Periodicals Meet Digital Archives, New York Public Library
Dada, Surrealism, and De Stijl Magazines on UbuWeb Historical
Index of Modernist Magazines, Davidson College 
Modernist Journal Project, Brown University and University of Tulsa
Spanish and Italian Modernist Studies Forum, Pennsylvania State University 
Collection: "Spanish Avant-Garde" from the University of Michigan Museum of Art

 
Contemporary art movements
Concepts in aesthetics
Modern art
Modernism